Charan Waghmare is a politician who served as a member of the 13th Maharashtra Legislative Assembly from 2014 to 2019. He was elected as MLA from the Tumsar Assembly Constituency. And he is very likely known leader in his constituency. He belonged to the local established party Vikas Foundation as Chairperson and formerly was belonging to Bharatiya Janata Party (BJP). In 2012, Waghmare was chairman of finance and works committee of Bhandara Zilla Parishad. In 2014 he was president of Bhandara district BJP.

Career
Charan Waghmare was chairman of the works committee of Bhandara Zilla Parishad (BZP) between June–July 2010 to January 2013. When he finished his term in 2019, he opened a branch of Vikas Foundation 2019.

2019 Maharashtra Legislative Assembly 
For the 2019 Maharashtra Legislative Assembly elections, BJP denied ticket for the Tumsar Assembly Constituency to Charan Waghmare, instead chose Pradeep Motiram Padole. In the aftermath, Charan Waghmare decided to contest the election as an independent candidate. He narrowly lost to sitting MLA Raju Karemore. Charan Waghmare was subsequently expelled from BJP for contesting the election as an independent candidate.

References

Maharashtra MLAs 2014–2019
People from Bhandara district
Maharashtra district councillors
Living people
Marathi politicians
Bharatiya Janata Party politicians from Maharashtra
1972 births